William Levery (June 3, 1879 - unknown) was an Apprentice First Class serving in the United States Navy during the Spanish–American War who received the Medal of Honor for valor.

Biography
Levery was born June 3, 1879, in Pennsylvania and after entering the US Navy was sent to fight in the Spanish–American War aboard the Montgomery-class cruiser U.S.S. Marblehead as an Apprentice First Class.

Medal of Honor citation
Rank and organization: Apprentice First Class, U.S. Navy. Born. 3 June 1879, Pennsylvania. Accredited to: Pennsylvania. G.O. No.: 521, 7 July 1899.

Citation:

On board the U.S.S. Marblehead during the operation of cutting the cable leading from Cienfuegos, Cuba, 11 May 1898. Facing the heavy fire of the enemy, Levery displayed extraordinary bravery and coolness throughout this action.

See also

List of Medal of Honor recipients for the Spanish–American War

References

External links

1879 births
United States Navy Medal of Honor recipients
United States Navy sailors
American military personnel of the Spanish–American War
Military personnel from Pennsylvania
1920 deaths
Spanish–American War recipients of the Medal of Honor